General Vega may refer to:

Camilo Alonso Vega (1889–1971), Spanish Army lieutenant general and honorary captain general 
Gerardo Clemente Vega (born 1940), Mexican Army general
José Marina Vega (1850–1926), Spanish Army lieutenant general
Nicolás Vega (fl. 1820s–1860s), Argentine civil war general